Lilcho Arsov (born 16 October 1972) is a former Bulgarian football goalkeeper, who is currently coach at PFC Botev Plovdiv and scout for Ludogorets Razgrad.

Arsov previously played for PFC Botev Plovdiv in the A PFG. A fan favourite, despite his large frame, Arsov was known for his quick reflexes.

References

Bulgarian footballers
1972 births
Living people
People from Parvomay
Association football goalkeepers
Botev Plovdiv players
PFC Lokomotiv Plovdiv players
First Professional Football League (Bulgaria) players